This is a list of major companies or subsidiaries headquartered in Houston, Texas and Greater Houston.

Fortune 500 companies based in Greater Houston

Other notable companies based in Houston
In addition to the Fortune 500 companies above, many other companies yes in multiple fields are headquartered or have based their US headquarters in Houston.

 Allis-Chalmers Energy
 Allpoint
 Al's Formal Wear
 American Bureau of Shipping
 American National Insurance Company (Galveston)
 Aon Hewitt
 Archimage
 Avelo Airlines
 Axiom Space
 Baker Botts
 BMC Software
 Bill.com
 Boardwalk Pipeline Partners
 Buc-Ee's (Pearland, Texas)
 Bracewell LLP
 Bristow Group
 Cadence Bank
 Cal Dive International
 CAMAC Energy
 Camden Property Trust
 Cardtronics
 Charming Charlie
 Chord Energy
 Citgo
 Civeo Corporation
 Comfort Systems USA
 Cooper Industries
 Coterra
 cPanel
 Cybersoft
 Diamond Offshore Drilling
 Direct Energy
 Dynegy
 Enbridge
 EnergyFunders
 Family Tree DNA
 Fertitta Entertainment
 Fiesta Mart
 FlightAware 
 Forum Energy Technologies
 Freeport-McMoRan Oil & Gas
 Fulbright & Jaworski
 Geokinetics
 Gexa Energy
 Golden Nugget Online
 Great Lakes Dredge & Dock Co
 Gulf South Pipeline
 Gulf States Toyota Distributors
 HCC Insurance Holdings
 Helix Energy Solutions Group
 Hines Interests Limited Partnership
 Honeywell
 HostGator
 Houston Wire & Cable
 Howard Hughes Corporation
 Insperity
 Integrated Electrical Services
 ION Geophysical
 James Coney Island
 KBR, Inc.
 Kelsey-Seybold Clinic
 Key Energy Services
 Kinder Morgan Energy Partners
 Kirby Corporation
 Landry's Restaurants
 Leisure Learning Unlimited
 Luby's
 Lukoil U.S.
 LyondellBasell US headquarters
 Mattress Firm
 Marathon Oil
 McDermott International
 Memorial Hermann Healthcare System
 The Methodist Hospital
 MetroCorp Bancshares
 Mexican Restaurants, Inc.
 Microvast
 Motiva Enterprises
 Murphy Oil
 Nabors Industries
 Nalco Champion
 Nutex Health
 Oceaneering International
 Omega Protein
 OpenStax
 Pappas Restaurants
 Par Pacific Holdings
 Patterson-UTI
 Piping Technology and Products
 Powell Industries
 PROS
 Randall's Food Markets
 Rice Epicurean Markets
 St. Luke's Episcopal Hospital
 Salata Salad Kitchen
 Seaboard International
 Service Corporation International
 Shipley Do-Nuts
 Simmons & Company International
 SnapStream
 Southwestern Energy
 Southwestern National Bank
 Spec's Wine, Spirits & Finer Foods
 Stage Stores Inc.
 Stewart & Stevenson
 Stewart Information Services Corporation
 Tailored Brands
 Tellurian
 Talos Energy
 Texas Children's Hospital
 Transwestern
 Valaris plc
 Vinson & Elkins
 Valencia Group
 Weatherford International
 Willbros Group 
 Woodforest National Bank

Foreign companies with American headquarters in Houston
Air Liquide
BHP
BP
Banorte
CEMEX
Daikin
EDP Renewables
Engie
Fugro
JX Nippon Oil & Energy
Mahindra Group
Mitsubishi Heavy Industries
PDVSA
Petrobras
Sasol
Sabic
Schlumberger
Shell plc
SK Innovation
TC Energy
TechnipFMC
Tokio Marine
TotalEnergies
Transocean
Wood Group
Worley
Yokogawa Electric

Companies with a large presence in Houston

 Amazon
 AIG
 Aon
 Collins Aerospace
 Chevron
 Deloitte
 ExxonMobil
 HP Inc.
 Honeywell
 Jacobs Engineering Group
 JP Morgan Chase
 Minute Maid
 Stellantis
 United Airlines Holdings
 Wells Fargo

Further reading

References

Houston
 
Companies